Fade from Grace is a five-part limited series written by Gabriel Benson, and illustrated and created by Jeff Amano; it is published by Beckett Comics.

Synopsis
John and Grace are an ordinary couple until John comes home one day to find his wife trapped inside their burning house. When John tries to save her, he discovers that he has superpowers. The mini-series focuses on the effects this has on their relationship, especially after John decides to take on the secret identity "Fade."

Publication history
Beckett Comics published the original five series run from August 2004 to March 2005. The issues were later collected into a trade paperback in November 2005, and distributed by Image Comics.

References

External links
 Fade from Grace at Image Comics website
 

2004 comics debuts
American comics titles